The 2005 MLS SuperDraft, held in Baltimore, Maryland on January 14, 2005, was the sixth incarnation of the annual Major League Soccer SuperDraft.  Expansion club Real Salt Lake had the first pick as the result of a coin toss (fellow newcomers C.D. Chivas USA got to go first in the expansion draft). RSL drafted Under-17 midfielder Nikolas Besagno with the first selection. 

A collective bargaining agreement with the MLS Players' Union dictated that the draft be reduced from six to four rounds, although a Supplemental Draft was held to equip newly formed reserve teams and compensate for expansion.

Player selection
Any player whose name is marked with an * was contracted under the Generation Adidas program.

Round one

Round one trades

Round two

Round two trades

Round three

Round three trades

Round four

Round four trades

Other draft day trades 
 MetroStars traded its natural second-round selection in the 2006 MLS SuperDraft to Real Salt Lake in exchange for a youth international slot.

Notable undrafted players

See also 
 Draft (sports)
 Generation Adidas
 Major League Soccer
 MLS SuperDraft

References 

Major League Soccer drafts
SuperDraft
MLS SuperDraft
MLS SuperDraft
Soccer in Baltimore
Events in Baltimore
MLS SuperDraft